The Appalachian Trail: A Biography is a 2021 non-fiction book written by Philip D'Anieri. D'Anieri wrote this book as biography and not as a guidebook or a history book. In the biography, Philip D' Anieri, who is a lecturer at University of Michigan mentions multiple personalities significant in the trail's history and also discusses  the stories of the Appalachian Trail founders and their motivations.

Reviews
The New York Times has referred to The Appalachian Trail as "D'Anieri's stalwart biography makes clear — that the work of humans, even a mere ribbon of dirt along an ancient ridgeline, will always bear the contradictions and complications of those whose hands — and feet — made it." Discover also wrote, "The Appalachian Trail acts as a portal into another world." Thomas Urquhart also gave a positive review, appreciating author's original approach and referred to the book as a satisfying biography at Press Herald. The book also received a starred review from Kirkus, which praised the detail and accessible tone.

References

2021 non-fiction books
Biographies (books)
Mariner Books books